a six point harness is a like five-point harness safety belt, but with a second belt for the legs
 6 Point Harness, an American animation studio